Tercer Frente (Spanish for "Third Front") is a municipality in the Santiago de Cuba Province of Cuba. It is centered on the town, and municipal seat, of Cruce de los Baños.

Geography
The municipality is located in the western part of the province, neighboring the province of Granma, and borders with the municipalities of Guisa, Jiguaní, Contramaestre, Palma Soriano and Guamá.

It includes the town of Cruce de los Baños and the villages of El Yayal, Manaca and Matias.

Demographics
In 2004, the municipality of Tercer Frente had a population of 30,457.

See also
Municipalities of Cuba
List of cities in Cuba

References

External links

Populated places in Santiago de Cuba Province